John C. Swanson, Jr. (born 1937) is an American bridge player living in Lancaster, California.
Swanson has won 1 Bermuda Bowl, and 5 North American Bridge Championships.

Bridge accomplishments

International Events

 Bermuda Bowl (4)
 1977 First
 1975 Second
 1973 Fourth
 1971 Sixth
 World Open Pairs (1)
 1978 Fifth

American Contract Bridge League (ACBL)

 Team Trials (5)
 1976 First
 1974 First
 1972 First
 1970 First
 1969 Second
 North American Bridge Championship Wins (5)
 Grand National Teams (2) 1974, 1976 
 Vanderbilt (2) 1969, 1977 
 Mitchell Board-a-Match Teams (1) 1970 

 North American Bridge Championship Runners-Up (2)
 Nail Life Master Open Pairs (1) 1968 
 Spingold (1) 1973

Writing

 Southern California Bridge News, Bidding Forum Moderator 1978-1987
 Western Conference Contract Bridge Forum, Bidding Forum Moderator 2009–present
 Author, “Inside the Bermuda Bowl” (1998)
 The Bridge World, contributor
 ACBL Bulletin, contributor
 Recap Bridge, Co-author (1972, 1973)

Bridge Theory

 Co-developer of the Walsh System

References

American contract bridge players
Bermuda Bowl players
Living people
1937 births
Date of birth missing (living people)
Place of birth missing (living people)
People from Mission Viejo, California